SP-56 is a highway in the eastern and the southeastern parts of the state of São Paulo in Brazil.  The highway runs from the SP-66 at Itaquauqecetuba up to Santa Isabel.

The highway is split into four sections:

 Alberto Hinoto, Doutor: from SP-66 (Itaquaquecetuba) to Arujá
 Albino Rodrigues Neves, Vereador: from Arujá to Santa Isabel
 Joaquim Simão, Former Mayor: from Igaratá to Santa Isabel

References 

Highways in São Paulo (state)